In solar physics, Hale's law, also known as Hale's polarity law or the Hale–Nicholson law, describes the tendency for bipolar active regions within the same northern or southern  hemisphere to have the same leading magnetic polarity with respect to the solar rotation, and for those in the opposite hemisphere to have the opposite leading polarity. It further describes how this pattern reverses from one sunspot cycle to the next. It is named after George Ellery Hale and Seth Barnes Nicholson. Hale's law, along with Joy's law, provides observational evidence for the solar dynamo.

History

The solar magnetic field was first detected in 1909 by George Ellery Hale when he showed observationally that sunspots had strong, bipolar magnetic fields. With these observations, Hale also noted how the majority of sunspot groups within the same  northern or southern hemisphere shared the same leading polarity and that this pattern reversed across the equator. As solar cycle 14 transitioned into solar cycle 15, further observations were carried out by Hale and his collaborators revealing in 1919 that the magnetic polarity of sunspot pairs within both hemispheres reversed from one 11-year sunspot cycle to the next. These patterns became collectively known as Hale's polarity law, or simply Hale's law.

Definition

Hale's law describes the magnetic polarity associated with solar active regions. The magnetic field of most active regions can usually be approximated by a pair of magnetic monopoles with opposite polarity, in which case the region is referred to as a bipolar active region. These poles are generally oriented so that one pole is leading with respect to the direction of solar rotation, and one pole is trailing.

Hale's law states that bipolar active regions have the following properties depending on whether the region is located in the northern or southern heliographic hemisphere:
 In the same hemisphere, regions tend to have the same leading polarity.
 In the opposite hemisphere, regions tend to have the opposite leading polarity.
 Leading polarities in both hemispheres reverse from one sunspot cycle to the next.

Anti-Hale regions
Bipolar active regions that violate Hale's law are known as anti-Hale regions. The estimated relative number of anti-hale regions varies from 2 to 9%, due to how often anti-Hale regions are misidentified.

Small, weak, ephemeral active regions violate Hale's law more frequently than average with a relative number around 40%. In contrast, only 4% of medium to large sized active regions violate Hale's law. Additionally, anti-Hale regions, and small regions in general, tend to have an orientation angle, or tilt, that does not follow Joy's law.

See also
 Spörer's law
 Gnevyshev–Ohl rule
 Sunspot
 List of solar cycles

References

Further reading
 

Solar phenomena
Solar cycles